Amizmiz is a small town in Morocco approximately 55 kilometers south of Marrakesh.  It lies at the foot of the High Atlas mountain range.

Its population of approximately 11,000  consists mainly of Amazighs of Shilha origin who speak the Tashelhit language (a branch of Tamazight languages).  Its weekly souk every Tuesday is well known in the area.

Geographically and economically, Amizmiz acts as a juncture point between the many small Berber villages in the surrounding area.  The weekly souk is an important part of this economic role, as individual Berber farmers from the hills surrounding Amizmiz bring their produce and livestock to sell and, in return, purchase packaged food items like tea and sugar—items brought in from Marrakech by local merchants.

References and notes

External links

 
 Photos/maps of Amizmiz on a Berber site.
 Cultural excursions based in Amizmiz.
 The official site of the Festival of Amizmiz.
 The official site of Amizmiz.

Marrakesh
Populated places in Al Haouz Province
Rural communes of Marrakesh-Safi